Sir Ian Macdonald Horobin (16 November 1899 – 5 June 1976) was a British Conservative Party politician, poet, and veteran of the First and Second World Wars. Horobin served as the Parliamentary Secretary to the Minister for Power from 1958 to 1959, but stood down from politics shortly before his conviction for indecent assault, for which he served four years in prison.

Biography
Horobin was the son of J. C. Horobin, the principal of Homerton College, Cambridge, and his wife, Maud Adeline née Ford (known after her second marriage as M. A. Cloudesley Brereton). He was educated at Highgate School and Sidney Sussex College, Cambridge.

Horobin initially served with the Royal Naval Reserve in World War I before joining the Royal Air Force. Upon the outbreak of the Second World War Horobin rejoined the Royal Air Force, and was promoted to squadron leader. In 1941 Horobin was captured by the Japanese and detained as a prisoner of war until his release in 1945. The Japanese tortured and beat Horobin after he refused to reveal the methods of escape by key prisoners led by Laurens van der Post, and he played an important role in facilitating morale among prisoners at the Soekaboemi prison camp after volunteering as the camp's hygiene officer.

In 1923, Horobin became the warden of the Mansfield House University Settlement in London's East End, which worked with vulnerable young men and children. Horobin helped raise over £500,000 for the settlement, and left it when he was elected as the National Member of Parliament (MP) for Southwark Central, a seat he held until 1935. Horobin returned to work at the settlement after the Second World War. He was given a knighthood in 1955 for his work at the institution.

Horobin stood in the Oldham West seat in the 1950 general election, where he lost to Labour's Leslie Hale. In 1951 Horobin successfully contested Oldham East, and held the seat with a narrow majority of 380 in the 1955 election. Horobin was the first member of the Conservative government to lose his seat at the 1959 general election.

Horobin presented two episodes of BBC radio's The Week in Westminster in 1932. In 1935 a judge found in favour of Horobin in a case of trespass at his home in Essex, Blue House Farm in Lambourne End. Horobin had put a gate across a lane leading to Hainault Forest having been disturbed by the parking of cars on the lane, and it had been torn down by a woman who claimed that it had always been used for this purpose. The judge ruled that the nature of the lane had not been that it was to be presumed a place to park vehicles. Horobin sold paintings from his collection at Sotheby's in March 1962.

It was announced on 29 March 1962 that Horobin was to receive a life peerage, but he withdrew his acceptance on 13 April, stating that the demands of the role would be too much for him.

Indecency trial
After denunciation by a clergyman, Horobin was held on indecency charges in May 1962, accused of several charges of indecent assault on boys aged under 16 in 1958 and 1959. A 17-year-old boy was also held with Horobin and he was jointly charged with committing two acts of indecency with Horobin in 1961, and attempting to procure another man for an act of indecency with Horobin.

As Warden of Mansfield House University Settlement, Horobin lived in a small flat there. According to Michael Bloch, Horobin's homosexual tastes were common knowledge among the residents, who were rewarded for yielding to Horobin's demands. He apparently formed "affectionate relationships" with some of them.

At the trial in June 1962, where Horobin was defended by Peter Rawlinson, QC, the prosecution alleged that Horobin had told his secretary that he was "virtually married" to the 17-year-old. Several witnesses at the trial testified to Horobin's behaviour and the manner of his assaults. Horobin admitted ten charges of assault in July 1962, and was sentenced to four years imprisonment. Horobin had told the secretary of the settlement that his relationships with boys had been going on for over 40 years and described homosexuals as "... us poor devils who are born like this; nothing can change me. It is natural for us to love boys in this way."

Unrepentant, Horobin told his friend John Betjeman: "I broke the law with me eyes open all my life until I went to prison. I broke it in prison. I broke it immediately I came out of prison, and I have not the slightest intention of ever paying any attention to it."

Death
Horobin moved to Tangier, Morocco, after his release from prison, and died there in 1976.

Bibliography
The Pleasures of Planning (1935)
Poems (1935)
More Poems (1939)
Collected Poems (1973)

References

External links

1899 births
1976 deaths
Alumni of Sidney Sussex College, Cambridge
British expatriates in Morocco
British non-fiction writers
Conservative Party (UK) MPs for English constituencies
English people convicted of child sexual abuse
English people convicted of indecent assault
British politicians convicted of crimes
Gay politicians
English LGBT politicians
Knights Bachelor
British male poets
People educated at Highgate School
Political sex scandals in the United Kingdom
Politics of the Metropolitan Borough of Oldham
Royal Air Force officers
Royal Air Force personnel of World War I
Royal Air Force personnel of World War II
Royal Naval Volunteer Reserve personnel of World War I
UK MPs 1931–1935
UK MPs 1951–1955
UK MPs 1955–1959
World War II prisoners of war held by Japan
20th-century British poets
LGBT members of the Parliament of the United Kingdom
Violence against men in the United Kingdom
Ministers in the Macmillan and Douglas-Home governments, 1957–1964
20th-century non-fiction writers
Male non-fiction writers
LGBT military personnel
20th-century English LGBT people
Royal Naval Reserve personnel